Triumph of the Will is a 1935 German Nazi propaganda film directed, produced, edited and co-written by Leni Riefenstahl. Adolf Hitler commissioned the film and served as an unofficial executive producer; his name appears in the opening titles. It chronicles the 1934 Nazi Party Congress in Nuremberg, which was attended by more than 700,000 Nazi supporters. The film contains excerpts of speeches given by Nazi leaders at the Congress, including Hitler, Rudolf Hess and Julius Streicher, interspersed with footage of massed Sturmabteilung (SA) and Schutzstaffel (SS) troops and public reaction. Its overriding theme is the return of Germany as a great power with Hitler as its leader. The film was produced after the Night of the Long Knives and many formerly prominent SA members are absent.

Following its release in March 1935, it became a major example of film used as propaganda and was well-received at home. Riefenstahl's techniques—such as moving cameras, aerial photography, the use of long-focus lenses to create a distorted perspective, and the revolutionary approach to the use of music and cinematography—have earned Triumph of the Will recognition as one of the greatest propaganda films in history. She won several awards in Germany, France and Italy.

During World War II, Frank Capra's seven-film series Why We Fight was directly inspired by Triumph of the Will and the United States' response to it. In present-day Germany, the film is not censored but the courts commonly classify it as Nazi propaganda, which requires an educational context for public screenings. The film continues to influence films, documentaries and commercials to this day.

Synopsis
The film begins with a prologue establishing the present-day as 5 September 1934 and the elapsed time since World War I, the Treaty of Versailles, Hitler's appointment as chancellor, climaxing in his visit to Nuremberg on that day. It is the only commentary in the entire film.

Day 1: The film opens with shots of the clouds above the city, and then moves through the clouds to float above the assembling masses below, with the intention of portraying beauty and majesty of the scene. The cruciform shadow of Hitler's plane is visible as it passes over the tiny figures marching below, accompanied by an orchestral arrangement of the Horst-Wessel-Lied. Upon arriving at the Nuremberg airport, Hitler and other Nazi leaders emerge from his plane to thunderous applause and a cheering crowd. He is then driven into Nuremberg, through equally enthusiastic people, to his hotel where a night rally is later held.

Day 2: The second day begins with images of Nuremberg at dawn, accompanied by an extract from the Act III Prelude (Wach Auf!) of Richard Wagner's Die Meistersinger von Nürnberg. Following this is a montage of the attendees preparing for the opening of the Reich Party Congress, and footage of the top Nazi officials arriving at the Luitpold Arena. The film then cuts to the opening ceremony, where Rudolf Hess announces the start of the Congress. The camera then introduces much of the Nazi hierarchy and covers their opening speeches, including Joseph Goebbels, Alfred Rosenberg, Hans Frank, Fritz Todt, Robert Ley and Julius Streicher. Then the film cuts to an outdoor rally for the Reichsarbeitsdienst (Labor Service), which is primarily a series of quasi-military drills by men carrying spades. This is also where Hitler gives his first speech on the merits of the Labour Service and praising them for their work in rebuilding Germany. The day then ends with a torchlight SA parade and fireworks display in which Viktor Lutze speaks to the crowds.

Day 3: The third day starts with a Hitler Youth rally on the parade ground. Again the camera covers the Nazi dignitaries arriving and the introduction of Hitler by Baldur von Schirach. Hitler then addresses the Youth, describing in militaristic terms how they must harden themselves and prepare for sacrifice. Everyone present, including General Werner von Blomberg, then assemble for a military pass and review, featuring Wehrmacht cavalry and various armored vehicles. That night Hitler delivers another speech to low-ranking party officials by torchlight, commemorating the first year since the Nazis took power and declaring that the party and state are one entity.

Day 4: The fourth day is the climax of the film, where the most memorable of the imagery is presented. Hitler, flanked by Heinrich Himmler and Viktor Lutze, walks through a long wide expanse with over 150,000 SA and SS troops standing at attention, to lay a wreath at a First World War memorial. Hitler then reviews the parading SA and SS men, following which Hitler and Lutze deliver a speech where they discuss the Night of the Long Knives purge of the SA several months prior. Lutze reaffirms the SA's loyalty to the regime, and Hitler absolves the SA of any crimes committed by Ernst Röhm. New party flags are consecrated by letting them touch the Blutfahne (the same cloth flag said to have been carried by the fallen Nazis during the Beer Hall Putsch) and, following a final parade in front of the Nuremberg Frauenkirche, Hitler delivers his closing speech. In it he reaffirms the primacy of the Nazi Party in Germany, declaring, "All loyal Germans will become National Socialists. Only the best National Socialists are party comrades!" Hess then leads the assembled crowd in a final Sieg Heil salute for Hitler, marking the close of the party congress. The entire crowd sings the Horst-Wessel-Lied as the camera focuses on the giant Swastika banner, which fades into a line of silhouetted men in Nazi party uniforms, marching in formation as the lyrics "Comrades shot by the Red Front and the Reactionaries march in spirit together in our columns" are sung.

Production

Riefenstahl, a popular German actress, had directed her first film called Das blaue Licht (The Blue Light) in 1932. Hitler was impressed with Das blaue Licht, and in 1933 asked her to direct a film about the Nazis' annual Nuremberg Rally, which became Der Sieg des Glaubens (The Victory of Faith). Hitler chose Riefenstahl as he wanted the film as "artistically satisfying" as possible to appeal to a non-political audience, but he also believed that propaganda must admit no element of doubt.

The Victory of Faith faced numerous technical problems, including a lack of preparation (Riefenstahl reported having just a few days) and Hitler's apparent unease at being filmed. Though the film apparently did well at the box office, it later became a serious embarrassment to the Nazis after SA Leader Ernst Röhm, who had a prominent role in the film, was executed during the Night of the Long Knives. All references to Röhm were ordered to be erased from German history, which included the destruction of all copies of The Victory of Faith. It was considered a lost film until a copy turned up in the 1980s in the German Democratic Republic's film archives.

In April 1934, Riefenstahl was commissioned by Hitler to create a successor film to The Victory of Faith. Riefenstahl however, remain focused on production of her own film Tiefland (which was released only in 1954), while fellow director Walter Ruttmann worked on the party film. Ruttmann's ideals departed significantly from The Victory of Faith and sought to reorient the focus of the film onto the history of the Nazi movement rather than Hitler himself. Hitler visited the studio on 6 December 1934 and permanently removed Ruttmann from the project, leaving Riefenstahl in sole control of what would become Triumph des Willens (Triumph of the Will).

Filming

The film follows a script similar to The Victory of Faith which is evident when one sees both films side by side. For example, the city of Nuremberg scenes—even to the shot of a cat included in the city driving sequence in both films. Riefenstahl shot Triumph of the Will on a budget of roughly 280,000 RM (approximately US$110,000 in 1934, $1.54 m in 2015). With that said, there were extensive preparations facilitated by the cooperation of party members, the military, and vital help from high-ranking Nazis like Goebbels. As Susan Sontag observed, "The Rally was planned not only as a spectacular mass meeting, but as a spectacular propaganda film."

Albert Speer, Hitler's personal architect, designed the set in Nuremberg and did most of the coordination for the event. Pits were dug in front of the speakers' platform so Riefenstahl could get the camera angles she wanted, and tracks were laid so that her cameramen could get traveling shots of the crowd. When rough cuts were not up to par, major party leaders and high-ranking public officials reenacted their speeches in a studio for her.

Riefenstahl had the difficult task of condensing an estimated 61 hours of film into two hours.

Reception
Triumph of the Will premiered on 28 March 1935 at the Berlin Ufa Palace Theater and was an instant success. Within two months the film had earned 815,000 Reichsmark (equivalent to  million  euros), and Ufa considered it one of the three most profitable films of that year. Hitler praised the film as being an "incomparable glorification of the power and beauty of our Movement." For her efforts, Riefenstahl was rewarded with the German Film Prize (Deutscher Filmpreis), a gold medal at the 1935 Venice Biennale, and the Grand Prix at the 1937 World Exhibition in Paris. However, there were few claims that the film would result in a mass influx of "converts" to fascism and the Nazis apparently did not make a serious effort to promote the film outside of Germany. Film historian Richard Taylor also said that Triumph of the Will was not generally used for propaganda purposes inside Nazi Germany. The Independent wrote in 2003: "Triumph of the Will seduced many wise men and women, persuaded them to admire rather than to despise, and undoubtedly won the Nazis friends and allies all over the world."

The reception in other countries was not always as enthusiastic. British documentarian Paul Rotha called it tedious, while others were repelled by its pro-Nazi sentiments. During World War II, Frank Capra helped to create a direct response, through the film series called Why We Fight, a series of newsreels commissioned by the United States government that spliced in footage from Triumph of the Will, but recontextualized it so that it promoted the cause of the Allies instead. Capra later remarked that Triumph of the Will "fired no gun, dropped no bombs. But as a psychological weapon aimed at destroying the will to resist, it was just as lethal." Clips from Triumph of the Will were also used in an Allied propaganda short called General Adolph Takes Over, set to the British dance tune "The Lambeth Walk". The legions of marching soldiers, as well as Hitler giving his Nazi salute, were made to look like wind-up dolls, dancing to the music. The Danish resistance used to take over cinemas and force the projectionist to show Swinging the Lambeth Walk (as it was also known); Erik Barrow has said: "The extraordinary risks were apparently felt justified by a moment of savage anti-Hitler ridicule." Also during World War II, the poet Dylan Thomas wrote a screenplay for and narrated These Are The Men, a propaganda piece using Triumph of the Will footage to discredit Nazi leadership.

One of the best ways to gauge the response to Triumph of the Will was the instant and lasting international fame it gave Riefenstahl. The Economist said it "sealed her reputation as the greatest female filmmaker of the 20th century." For a director who made eight films, only two of which received significant coverage outside of Germany, Riefenstahl had unusually high name recognition for the remainder of her life, most of it stemming from Triumph of the Will. However, her career was also permanently damaged by this association. After the war, Riefenstahl was imprisoned by the Allies for four years for allegedly being a Nazi sympathizer and was permanently blacklisted by the film industry. When she died in 2003—sixty-eight years after the film's premiere—her obituary received significant coverage in many major publications, including the Associated Press, The Wall Street Journal, The New York Times, and The Guardian, most of which reaffirmed the importance of Triumph of the Will.

Ethical controversy

Like American filmmaker D. W. Griffith's The Birth of a Nation, Triumph of the Will has been criticized as a use of spectacular filmmaking to promote a profoundly unethical system. In her defense, Riefenstahl claimed that she was naïve about the Nazis when she made it and had no knowledge of Hitler's genocidal or anti-semitic policies. She also pointed out that Triumph of the Will contains "not one single anti-semitic word", although it does contain a veiled comment by Julius Streicher that "a people that does not protect its racial purity will perish".

However, Roger Ebert has observed that for some, "the very absence of anti-semitism in Triumph of the Will looks like a calculation; excluding the central motif of almost all of Hitler's public speeches must have been a deliberate decision to make the film more efficient as propaganda."

Riefenstahl said in 1964:

However, Riefenstahl was an active participant in the rally, though in later years she downplayed her influence significantly, claiming, "I just observed and tried to film it well. The idea that I helped to plan it is downright absurd." Ebert states that Triumph of the Will is "by general consent [one] of the best documentaries ever made", but added that because it reflects the ideology of a movement regarded by many as evil, it poses "a classic question of the contest between art and morality: Is there such a thing as pure art, or does all art make a political statement?" When reviewing the film for his "Great Movies" collection, Ebert reversed his opinion, characterizing his earlier conclusion as "the received opinion that the film is great but evil" and calling it "a terrible film, paralyzingly dull, simpleminded, overlong and not even 'manipulative', because it is too clumsy to manipulate anyone but a true believer".

Writing in 1975, Susan Sontag considers Triumph of the Will the "most successful, most purely propagandistic film ever made, whose very conception negates the possibility of the filmmaker's having an aesthetic or visual conception independent of propaganda." Sontag points to Riefenstahl's involvement in the planning and design of the Nuremberg ceremonies as evidence that Riefenstahl was working as a propagandist, rather than as an artist in any sense of the word. With some 30 cameras and a crew of 150, the marches, parades, speeches, and processions were orchestrated like a movie set for Riefenstahl's film. Further, this was not the first political film made by Riefenstahl for the Nazis (there was Victory of Faith, 1933), nor was it the last (Day of Freedom, 1935, and Olympia, 1938). "Anyone who defends Riefenstahl's films as documentary", Sontag states, "if documentary is to be distinguished from propaganda, is being disingenuous. In Triumph of Will, the document (the image) is no longer simply the record of reality; 'reality' has been constructed to serve the image."  This is considerably different from the position she takes ten years earlier in a 1965 essay entitled "On Style," where she opposes the idea that Riefenstahl's propaganda films are purely propaganda, and writes:  "To call Leni Riefenstahl's The Triumph of the Will and The Olympiad masterpieces is not to gloss over Nazi propaganda with aesthetic lenience.  The Nazi propaganda is there.  But something else is there, too, which we reject at our loss.  Because they project the complex movements of intelligence and grace and sensuousness, these two films of Riefenstahl (unique among works of Nazi artists) transcend the categories of propaganda or even reportage.  And we find ourselves—to be sure, rather uncomfortably—seeing 'Hitler' and not Hitler, the '1936 Olympics' and not the 1936 Olympics.  Through Riefenstahl's genius as a film-maker, the 'content' has—let us even assume, against her intentions—come to play a purely formal role."

Influences and legacy

Triumph of the Will remains well known for its striking visuals. As one historian notes, "many of the most enduring images of the [Nazi] regime and its leader derive from Riefenstahl's film."

Extensive excerpts of the film were used in Erwin Leiser's documentary Mein Kampf, produced in Sweden in 1960. Riefenstahl unsuccessfully sued the Swedish production company Minerva-Film for copyright violation, although she did receive forty thousand marks in compensation from German and Austrian distributors of the film.

In 1942, Charles A. Ridley of the British Ministry of Information made a short propaganda film called among other names Schichlegruber - Doing the Lambeth Walk and Lambeth Walk – Nazi Style, which edited footage of Hitler and German soldiers from the film to make it appear they were marching and dancing to the song "The Lambeth Walk". The targeted-at-Nazis parody of "The Lambeth Walk" (a British dance that had been popular in swing clubs in Germany which the Nazis denounced as "Jewish mischief and animalistic hopping") so enraged Joseph Goebbels that reportedly he ran out of the screening room kicking chairs and screaming profanities. The propaganda film was distributed uncredited to newsreel companies, who would supply their own narration.

Charlie Chaplin's satire The Great Dictator (1940) was inspired in large part by Triumph of the Will. Frank Capra used significant footage, with a mocking narration in the first installment of the propagandistic film produced by the United States Army Why We Fight as an exposure of Nazi militarism and totalitarianism to American soldiers and sailors.

Copyright

Germany
Riefenstahl filed lawsuits against two postwar documentaries which had incorporated footage of Triumph of the Will. The first lawsuit occurred in 1954 against Wolfgang Hartwig, producer of Bis fünf nach zwölf. Hartwig argued that the rights belonged to the state, but reportedly eventually paid compensation to Riefenstahl, who donated it to a charity dedicated to returning prisoners of war. Her second lawsuit against Swedish producer Erwin Leiser's Mein Kampf in 1960 was enveloped in greater public debate about the copyright and morality of works produced during the Nazi regime. The case was settled against her in 1969.

In a judgement by the Federal Court of Justice on 29 December 1966, the copyright to the film was transferred to the Federal Republic of Germany as the legal successor of Nazi Germany. These rights are administered by the federally owned Transit-Film GmbH based in Munich, although it was contractually regulated in 1974 that any public screening until 2004 had to be approved by Riefenstahl and that she received 70% of all revenues.

United States
In 1996, the copyrights of the film were restored to Riefenstahl under the Uruguay Round Agreements Act, although some aspect of the US copyrights are uncertain.

See also
 The Birth of a Nation (1915 American film), which inspired the "second" KKK's formation
 List of German films of 1933–1945
 Nazism and cinema

Notes

References

Works cited

Further reading 
 
 
 Shirer, William. Berlin Diary: The Journal of a Foreign Correspondent 1934–1941. New York, Alfred A. Knopf, 1941. Includes a contemporary account of the 1934 Nuremberg rally.
  (Complete screenplay.)

External links

 Das Blaue Licht: Triumph des Willens (1935), the original Riefenstahl website
 Screenplay of Triumph of the Will, DasBlaueLicht.net
 Hinter den Kulissen des Reichsparteitag-Films, Riefenstahl's 1935 book on the making of the film with many photographs 
 
 

1935 documentary films
1935 films
1930s German-language films
Black-and-white documentary films
1930s historical films
German black-and-white films
German documentary films
German historical films
Films directed by Leni Riefenstahl
Films of Nazi Germany
Films shot in Bavaria
Nazi propaganda films
Nuremberg Rally films
Films about Adolf Hitler
UFA GmbH films
1930s German films